Jackson Lake Dam is a concrete and earth-fill dam in the western United States, at the outlet of Jackson Lake in northwestern Wyoming. The lake and dam are situated within Grand Teton National Park in Teton County. The Snake River emerges from the dam and flows about  through Wyoming, Idaho, Oregon, and Washington to its mouth on the Columbia River in eastern Washington.

The chief purpose of the dam is to provide water storage for irrigation in the Snake River basin in the state of Idaho as part of the Minidoka Project. Jackson Lake is a natural lake, but its depth was increased by the dam to provide water storage.

History
The first Jackson Lake Dam was a log-crib dam constructed in 1906–07 across the outlet of Jackson Lake, a natural lake. The new dam was designed by Frank A. Banks, who would later supervise the construction of Grand Coulee Dam.

The reservoir was created by damming the outlet of the natural glacial Jackson Lake, with the additional height creating a storage pool for the Minidoka Project, which provides irrigation water from the Snake River for farmlands in Idaho. At the time of the dam's construction, Jackson Hole and the Teton Range were as yet unprotected from development. Grand Teton National Park was established in 1929, and excluded Jackson Lake.

The lake was incorporated into Jackson Hole National Monument when it was proclaimed by President Franklin D. Roosevelt under the Antiquities Act, and became a part of Grand Teton National Park in 1950 when the park was expanded to encompass the national monument lands. When the dam was built there was no attempt to clear the shores of the lake of standing timber, resulting in an unsightly band of dead trees when the waters rose. This vista, and the mudflats created by drawdown of lake waters, were cited in later years in successful arguments against reservoirs in Yellowstone National Park.

Construction personnel for the dam were housed at a temporary camp that dwarfed the nearby town of Moran.  Supplies came in from the Grassy Lake Road north of the park, which runs west into Idaho to meet the nearest railhead at Ashton, Idaho.

Reinforcement
The U.S. Bureau of Reclamation conducted studies on dams in 1976 and determined that Jackson Lake Dam was susceptible to failure in case of an earthquake of magnitude 5.5 or greater. Following the Borah Peak earthquake of 1983 in Idaho, the dam was upgraded during 1986–1989, and the Bureau of Reclamation believed it could withstand the "maximum credible earthquake," a magnitude 7.5 quake on the Teton fault. Since then various studies have cast doubt on this belief.

Dam facts and figures
The dam is owned and operated by the U.S. Bureau of Reclamation, which maintains the water level above the lake's natural elevation for downstream irrigation.

Type: Concrete gravity dam with earthen embankment wings
Drainage area: 
Lake elevation:
Normal full pool: 
Maximum pool: 
Minimum pool: 
Maximum water surface: 
Usable storage (6730–6760 ft): 
Crest elevation: 
Crest length: 
Crest width: 
Base width: 
Structural height:

See also
List of dams in the Columbia River watershed

References

External links 
U.S. Bureau of Reclamation: Jackson Lake Dam 
U.S. Bureau of Reclamation: Minidoka Project
University of Wyoming: The Operation and Management of Jackson Lake Dam 
U.S. Army Corps of Engineers: Jackson Lake Dam and Lake Hydrologic Data 
U.S. National Park Service: The Snake River: Responses to Jackson Lake Dam (PDF)[link expired]

Dams in Wyoming
Dams on the Snake River
Buildings and structures in Teton County, Wyoming
Minidoka Project
United States Bureau of Reclamation dams
Dams completed in 1916
Gravity dams
1916 establishments in Wyoming